Lambda Pyxidis (λ Pyxidis) is a yellow-hued star in the southern constellation of Pyxis. It is visible to the naked eye, having an apparent visual magnitude of 4.68. Based upon an annual parallax shift of 16.98 mas as seen from Earth, it is located around 192 light years from the Sun.

Measurements of changes in the star's proper motion over time indicate this is an astrometric binary system. It is a red clump star that is generating energy through the fusion of helium at its core.

Lambda Pyxidis has double the mass of the Sun and is an estimated 1.3 billion years old. It is radiating 49 times the Sun's luminosity from its photosphere at an effective temperature of 5,126 K.

References

G-type giants
Horizontal-branch stars
Astrometric binaries
Pyxidis, Lambda
Pyxis (constellation)
Durchmusterung objects
081169
046026
3733